Federal Route 249, or Jalan FELDA Mengkawang-Bukit Diman (formerly Terengganu State Route T117), is a federal road in Terengganu, Malaysia. The Kilometre Zero is at Bukit Diman.

Features

At most sections, the Federal Route 249 was built under the JKR R5 road standard, with a speed limit of 90 km/h.

List of junctions and towns

References

Malaysian Federal Roads